The Elephant in the Room is the eighth studio album by American rapper Fat Joe. The album was released on March 11, 2008, by Terror Squad, Virgin Records, and Imperial Records. Production for the album was done by Scott Storch, Cool and Dre, Danja, DJ Khaled, DJ Premier, Swizz Beatz, The Alchemist, Streetrunner, and The Hitmen, and guest contributions came from artists like Beatz, Plies, Lil Wayne, J. Holiday, and KRS-One.

The album received a generally positive reception but critics felt it was inconsistent in its mixture of production and lyricism. The Elephant in the Room spawned two singles: "I Won't Tell" and "Ain't Sayin' Nothin'". The album debuted at number six on the US Billboard 200, selling 47,000 copies in its first week.

Critical reception

The Elephant in the Room garnered positive reviews but music critics were divided by the production and lyrical content. Nathan Slavik of DJBooth praised the album's varied production for allowing Joe to deliver different topics through various regional flows, saying that, "While Joe has never produced a truly classic album, Elephant In The Room proves that his contributions to the game have been significant and long-lasting." AllMusic editor David Jeffries also praised Joe for changing his flow when switching from street tracks to radio singles, despite finding the drug talk monotonous and a lack of cohesion between him and the producers, concluding with, "Still, Joe warns the listener right at the beginning that he's more Eazy-E than Ice Cube -- and for three-fourths of the album, he's spot on." Latifah Muhammad of AllHipHop found a lack of cohesion between Joe and the producers on the record but felt that he managed to deliver tracks both commercially and artistically, saying that it "manages to show off Joes' clever mixture of street anthems and radio shiny tunes."

HipHopDX staff writer Mcooper found a lack of consistency throughout the album, praising some tracks for its mixture of new-school production and lyrics reminiscent of old-school hip-hop but found the rest of it weak and hollow, saying that "Joe has the talent to put out a classic caliber album, but as long as he wants to stay current with the downloads and ringtones, that vision may not come to pass." Ben Westhoff of The Phoenix was mixed about the record, finding the lyrical content generic but felt that Joe added some needed empathy in his material, saying that "What makes it work is his vulnerability, a rare commodity in hip-hop. Unlike associate Rick Ross, who keeps letting you know that he’s the “boss,” Joe just wants to entertain you." Jesal Padania of RapReviews felt that Joe copied the formula from Me, Myself & I for the album, criticizing the production for being mediocre at best and not allowing him to make good use of them, saying that "In other words, can I really recommend you purchasing this album? Not really - and I would class myself as a Fat Joe fan. I will recommend that you purchase a few of the songs from iTunes, but that is the best I can do."

Commercial performance
The Elephant in the Room debuted at number six on the US Billboard 200 chart, selling 47,125 copies in its first week. This became Joe's third US top-ten debut. The album also debuted at number three on the US Top R&B/Hip-Hop Albums chart, becoming Joe's sixth top-ten album on this chart. In its second week, the album dropped to number 56 on the chart. In its third week, the album dropped to number 74 on the chart and left the chart the following week.

Track listing

Personnel
Credits for The Elephant in the Room adapted from AllMusic.

 Angelo Aponte – engineer, vocal engineer
 Marcella Araica – vocal engineer, vocal producer
 Jesus Bobe – programming
 Flex Cabrera – management
 Brian "Big Bass" Gardner – mastering
 Ed "Wolverine" Goldstein – bass
 Jayne Grodd – administration
 Infamous – keyboards
 Derrick Jenner – assistant engineer
 Chad Jolley – mixing assistant

 Jeff "Gemcrates" Ladd – engineer
 Ed Lidow – assistant engineer, mixing assistant
 Jonathan Mannion – photography
 Fabian Marasciullo – mixing
 Raul Pena – engineer
 Kiethen Pittman – keyboards
 Adrian "Drop" Sanpalla – vocal engineer, vocal producer
 Brian Springer – vocal engineer
 Javier Valverde – engineer, vocal engineer, vocal producer
 Danny Zook – sample clearance

Charts

Weekly charts

Year-end charts

References

2008 albums
Fat Joe albums
Albums produced by Danja (record producer)
Albums produced by Scott Storch
Albums produced by DJ Premier
Albums produced by Swizz Beatz
Albums produced by Cool & Dre
Albums produced by the Alchemist (musician)
Albums produced by DJ Khaled